Songdog is a Welsh folk noir duo. As of May 2021, current members are Lyndon Morgans (vocals, acoustic guitar, songwriting/arrangement) and Karl Woodward (electric guitar, mandolin, banjo, keyboards, harmonica). 

Previous members include Dave Paterson, Jasper Salmon, Malcolm Phillips, and Robert Lesniewski.

Albums
Songdog's latest album, A Happy Ending, was released in March 2020 on Junkyard Songs, receiving 9/10 from Uncut magazine (Allan Jones), 4 stars from The Mirror (Gavin Martin), 4 stars from Rock n Reel (Nick Toczek) and 9/10 from Americana UK (Tim Martin).  

The band’s debut album, The Way of the World, was self-released in June 2001. In 2003 the band’s second album, Haiku, was released on Evangeline Records. The album received a four (out of five) star review in Uncut. By the time of the third album in 2006 the band had signed with One Little Indian Records. 2008’s A Wretched Sinner's Song was a double album released to mixed reviews. Their fifth album isA Life Eroding  Mojo awarded the album four (out of five) stars. Songdog's sixth album Last Orders at Harry's Bar was released in 2013. Joy Street, their seventh, was released in late summer 2017 on Junkyard Songs (trailered earlier by single "It's Not A Love Thing"), produced by Nigel Stonier (who also worked with Fairport Convention and Joan Baez).

Albums
 The Way of the World (Self-released, 2001)
 Haiku (Evangeline Records, 2003)
 The Time of Summer Lightning (One Little Indian Records, 2005)
 A Wretched Sinner's Song (One Little Indian Records, 2008) Leaked on 16 January 2008.
 A Life Eroding (One Little Indian Records, 26 Apr. 2010)
 Last Orders at Harry's Bar (Junkyard Songs, 7 Oct. 2013)
 Joy Street (Junkyard Songs, July 2017)
 A Happy Ending (Junkyard Songs, March 2020)

References

External links
 Americana UK, July 2017
 Whisperin & Hollerin, June 2005

Welsh indie rock groups
People from Blackwood, Caerphilly
1970s establishments in Wales
Musical groups established in the 2000s